Anaita Shroff Adajania is an Indian fashion stylist, costume designer and actress. She is the Fashion Director for Vogue India magazine.

Early life
Adajania was born in Mumbai in a Parsi family. She attended The Bombay International School and St. Xavier's College, Mumbai.

Career
She started her career as assistant fashion editor with Elle magazine, upon its Indian launch in 1996. Subsequently, she worked with L'Officiel India, before becoming the fashion director at Vogue India.

The owner of the Style Cell company, Adajania has been noted for her design work on several Bollywood films including Dhoom 2, Being Cyrus, Everybody Says I'm Fine!, Love Aaj Kal and Cocktail. She has notably styled all three films in the Dhoom series, starting with Dhoom (2004) where she worked with John Abraham and Esha Deol's look, followed by Dhoom 2 (2006) where in she worked with Aishwarya Rai Bachchan, Hrithik Roshan and Bipasha Basu, then in 2013 edition of the franchise Dhoom 3, she styled Katrina Kaif.

Her designs have also been featured in magazines including Vogue, L'Officiel, Elle and Rolling Stone. Shroff also currently styles actress Deepika Padukone exclusively for all of her events.

Apart from this, she has acted in walk-on roles in films, like Dilwale Dulhaniya Le Jayenge (1995), wherein she played Sheena, Simran's (Kajol) friend in London whom Raj (Shah Rukh Khan) flirts with at the start of the European trip.  In Kal Ho Naa Ho (2003), she played Gita, Rohit's (Saif Ali Khan) friend.

Filmography

Personal life

She married Indian film director and screenwriter Homi Adajania in 2002 who directed Being Cyrus (2006) and Cocktail (2012). The couple has two sons and she is the sister of Scherezade Shroff.

Her sister, Scherezade Shroff is a YouTube vlogger. She married actor Vaibhav Talwar in 2016.

Awards

References

External links
 

1970s births
Living people
Indian costume designers
Businesspeople from Mumbai
Fashion stylists
Date of birth missing (living people)
Businesswomen from Maharashtra
21st-century Indian designers
20th-century Indian designers
Women artists from Maharashtra
21st-century Indian women artists
20th-century Indian women artists
Artists from Mumbai
Indian women fashion designers
Parsi people from Mumbai
Year of birth missing (living people)